Sister of Mine is a 2017 Spanish-Colombian incest-themed erotic drama film directed by Pedro Aguilera which stars Ivana Baquero and Julio Perillán alongside Lucía Guerrero, Nicolás Coronado, Elisabet Gelabert and Juan Pablo Shuk.

Plot 
Oliver, a Los Angeles-based erotic film director, finds out by chance an explicit video featuring his little half sister Aurora. He thereby goes back to his hometown in Madrid, where his obsession with Aurora gets him to secretly install a webcam in the latter's bedroom.

Cast

Production 
The screenplay was penned by Pedro Aguilera alongside Juan Carlos Sampedro. The film is a Spanish-Colombian co-production. Production companies included Carmelita Films and Ciudad Lunar.

Release 
The film screened at the 46th International Film Festival Rotterdam (IFFR) in January 2017.

Distributed by Good Films, the film was theatrically released in Spain on 12 May 2017.

Reception 
Eulàlia Iglesias of El Confidencial considered that while Pedro Aguilera handles extreme material, the film "fails to become the transgressive and borderline film it was intended to be", while she praised Baquero's performance.

Quim Casas of El Periódico de Catalunya scored 3 out of 5 stars, deeming the film to be "a tale of seduction and obsession" with an extreme proposal that is not fully delivered, but which leaves more than one disturbance along the way.

Jonathan Rommey of ScreenDaily pointed out that, presence of "sibling incest, camcorder voyeurism, even a splash of mud-soaked bondage" notwithstanding, the film, "though confidently executed, comes across as a solemn damp squib", highlighting that it "doesn't have much more to offer in the way of psychological insight".

Jordi Costa of El País described the film as "an absorbing story about the transgression of taboos in a universe governed by the toxicity of the gaze and the devaluation of the power of the image due to the over-saturation of stimuli".

Carlos Marañón of Cinemanía gave the film 3½ out of 5 stars, considering that Chabrolian mystery-like picture is underpinned by both the director's formal vigour and by the truthful performance delivered by Ivana Baquero.

See also 
 List of Spanish films of 2017

References 

Spanish drama films
Colombian drama films
2017 drama films
2010s Spanish-language films
Incest in film
2010s Spanish films
2010s Colombian films